Black Tambourine was an American pop band. 

Black Tambourine may also refer to:

Black Tambourine (album), a 2010 compilation album by Black Tambourine
"Black Tambourine", a song by Withered Hand from New Gods
"Black Tambourine", a song by Beck from Guero